Heinz Weixelbraun (born 19 May 1963) is an Austrian actor. He is best known for his performance as Christian Böck in Inspector Rex.

References

External links 

1963 births
Living people
Austrian male film actors